Copper Mountain (a Club Med Experience) (also known as just Copper Mountain) is a 1983 Canadian comedy film written and directed by Damian Lee and David Mitchell. Starring Jim Carrey and Alan Thicke, it is a quasi-commercial for the now-closed Club Med ski resort in Copper Mountain, Colorado. The majority of the runtime consists of interspersed performances by prominent country and rhythm and blues musicians, such as Ronnie Hawkins, Rita Coolidge and Chicago frontman Bill Champlin, with whom accomplished song writer Thicke co-wrote the popular song "Sara".

Plot
Two friends, Bobby Todd (Carrey) and Jackson Reach (Thicke), travel from their hometown of Grimsby to the Club Med village in Copper Mountain. Jackson intends to hit the slopes and ski, while Bobby attempts to seduce women with impressions and routines. Eventually, Jackson wins a challenge race, and Bobby finds companionship by being himself.

Cast
 Jim Carrey as  Bobby Todd / Sammy Davis Jr.
 Alan Thicke as  Jackson Reach
 Jean-Claude Killy as himself
 Richard Gautier (credited as Dick Gautier) as  Sonny Silverton 
 Ziggy Lorenc (credited as Ziggy Laurence) as  Michelle 
 Rod Hebron as  Yogi Hebadaddy 
 Jean Laplac as Chef de Village

The film largely consists of on-screen performances by prominent musicians, appearing alone or together as a de facto group, singing on a hillside stage and in the facility’s nightclub:

 Rita Coolidge as herself
 Ronnie Hawkins as himself
 Bill Champlin as himself
 Danny Marks as Guitarist  
 David James as Drummer
 Steve Sexton as Keyboardist
 Mike Utley as Keyboardist
 Brian Bell as Bass Guitarist
 Jon Bojicic as Rhythm Guitarist 
 Tamara Champlin as Vocalist

The film’s writer and co-producer, Damian Lee, appears as Helicopter Guide.

References

External links
 

1983 films
Films set in Colorado
1983 comedy films
Canadian sports comedy films
Canadian skiing films
English-language Canadian films
Films produced by Damian Lee
Films with screenplays by Damian Lee
1980s English-language films
1980s Canadian films